Promona was an ancient city inhabited by the Illyrians. Promona was the location a Roman cohort in the territory of the Delmatae. The location is the modern-day village of Tepljuh, north of Drnis.

See also 
List of settlements in Illyria

References

Bibliography 
 Wilkes, J. J. The Illyrians, 1992, 

Former populated places in the Balkans
Cities in ancient Illyria
Šibenik-Knin County
Illyrian Croatia
Archaeology of Illyria